Horror Wrestling is the first studio album by the Swedish all-female Grunge/Metal band Drain STH, released on 5 June 1996 (see 1996 in music). It was the band's first full album, following the Serve the Shame EP released three years previous.

Track listing
 "I Don't Mind" (lyrics: Sjöholm; music: Drain STH) 3:43
 "Smile" (lyrics: Sjöholm; music: Axén, Kjellberg) 4:14
 "Serve the Shame" (lyrics & music: Sjöholm) 3:57
 "Mirror's Eyes" (mislabeled as "Mirror's Smile" on the back of the 1998 album) (lyrics: Sjöholm; music: Drain STH) 3:57
 "Someone" (lyrics: Axén; music: Axén, Kjellberg) 4:24
 "Crucified" (lyrics: Axén; music: Axén, Canel) 4:09
 "Stench" (lyrics: Axén; music: Axén, Canel) 4:59
 "Crack the Liar's Smile" (lyrics: Sjöholm; music: Kjellberg) 4:01
 "Klotera" (lyrics: Axén; music: Axén, Canel, Kjellberg) 3:46
 "Mind Over Body" (lyrics: Axén; music: Axén, Canel) 5:38
 "Unforgiving Hours" (lyrics: Axén; music: Axén, Kjellberg) 4:53
 "Unreal" (lyrics: Axén; music: Axén, Kjellberg) 4:48

The album was reissued in 1998 with an orange-tinted cover and three bonus tracks:
 "(So I Will Burn) Alone" (lyrics: Axén; music: Axén, Canel, Kjellberg) 4:29
 "Serve the Shame (Acoustic)" (lyrics & music: Sjöholm) 3:35
 "Ace of Spades" (Lemmy, Phil Taylor, Eddie Clarke) 5:02

The Crack the Liar's Smile single included a bonus track called "Without Eyes". It was recorded during the Horror Wrestling sessions, but had not previously been released.

A 2-track single for "Serve the Shame" was also released. This included the acoustic version heard on the reissued of Horror Wrestling, as well as an unplugged version of the track.

Personnel
 Maria Sjöholm: vocals
 Flavia Canel: guitar
 Anna Kjellberg: bass
 Martina Axén: drums, backing vocals

Additional Personnel:
 Nico Elgstrand: acoustic guitar on "Crack the Liar's Smile," "Mirror's Eyes," and "Unforgiving Hours"
 Sebastian Öberg: cello on "I Don't Mind," "Mind Over Body," "Unforgiving Hours" and "Unreal"
 Orjan Örnkloo: samples on "I Don't Mind"

References

External links
Artists Direct Review

Drain STH albums
1996 debut albums
Mercury Records albums